"Put Your Love on Me" is a song by Swedish singer and footballer Boris René. The song was released in Sweden as a digital download on 20 February 2016, and was written by René along with Tobias Lundgren and Tim Larsson. It took part in Melodifestivalen 2016, and qualified to andra chansen from the third semi-final. In andra chansen, it qualified to the final, where it placed tenth.

Track listing

Charts

Weekly charts

Release history

References

2015 songs
2016 singles
Melodifestivalen songs of 2016
Boris René songs
Songs written by Tobias Lundgren
Songs written by Tim Larsson
English-language Swedish songs